Ju is a language from the West Chadian branch of the Chadic language family. The language is spoken solely in Nigeria, and had approximately 900 native speakers in 1993. The language is unwritten.

Classification 
Ju is part of the Guruntum (Gurdung according to the work of Roger Blench) group of the South Bauchi language group, and is thus similar to the Guruntum, Tala, and Zangwal languages.

General Information 
The Ju language is spoken primarily in the village of the same name, Ju, which lies to the south of Bauchi. The village is in the Bauchi local government area in the state of Bauchi.

Ju shares language borders mosty with other West Chadic languages; Zangwal to the north, Tala to the northwest, the Polchi language cluster to the west, and the Kir-Balar language to the south. To the east, Ju borders the sprachbund of the Dulbu language.

Information on the number of speakers of the Ju language is varied: in 1971, Ju had around 150 speakers, and Ethnologue measured 900 in 1993. However, the Joshua Project, has reported that Ju is used solely among the older generation, while the youth are switching to Hausa.

References

External links 
 
 
 

Languages of Nigeria
Chadic languages